Barron Keith Tanner (born September 14, 1973) is a former American football defensive tackle in the National Football League for the Miami Dolphins and Arizona Cardinals, as well as the Washington Redskins.  He played college football at the University of Oklahoma and was drafted in the fifth round of the 1997 NFL Draft.

References

1973 births
Living people
American football defensive linemen
Miami Dolphins players
Washington Redskins players
Arizona Cardinals players
Oklahoma Sooners football players
People from Athens, Texas
Players of American football from Texas